The 2015 South American Rugby Championship (Confederación Sudamericana de Rugby (CONSUR) Championship) Division A was the second edition of the newly formatted South American Rugby Championship, that included promotion and relegation. 2015, continued on with CONSUR choosing not to elect a host country or city, opting to spread the tournament around South America. For Uruguay, the tournament acted as preparation matches ahead of their appearance in the 2015 Rugby World Cup, their first since 2003. In addition to this, on the 23 April, Uruguay took a week out of this tournament, to host a friendly match against the USA Select side.

Chile were the champions following their victory over 2015 Rugby World Cup participants Uruguay. This was the first time Chile had won the South American Rugby Championship.

Standings

Pre-tournament rankings are in parentheses.

Matches
The dates and venues were announced on 7 April.

Week 1

Week 2

Week 3

Week 4

Week 5

See also
 2015 CONSUR Cup
 2015 South American Rugby Championship "B"
 2015 South American Rugby Championship "C"

References

2015
2015 rugby union tournaments for national teams
A
rugby union
rugby union
rugby union
rugby union
International rugby union competitions hosted by Uruguay
International rugby union competitions hosted by Chile
International rugby union competitions hosted by Paraguay
International rugby union competitions hosted by Brazil